The Rotisken’rakéhte, also known as the Mohawk Warrior Society and the Kahnawake Warrior Society, is a Mohawk group that seeks to assert Mohawk authority over their traditional lands, including the use of tactics such as roadblocks, evictions, and occupations. 

The society was founded in 1971 in Kahnawake, Québec, Canada. It first gained notoriety in 1973 when they, along with American Indian Movement activists, held a standoff with the Quebec Provincial Police at Kahnawake, and another in Oka, Québec in 1990. The members of this society are known as Warriors.

Flag

The Mohawk Warrior Flag was designed by Karoniaktajeh Louis Hall in 1974. Hall was an artist, writer, and activist from Kahnawake. It was initially called the "unity flag" or "Indian flag", depicting an Indigenous man with long hair over top a yellow sunburst and red banner. This was changed in the 1980's with the man being replaced with a Kanien’kehá:ka (Mohawk) warrior. The flag was highlighted in the media during the Oka Crisis and became a symbol of resistance for Kanien’kehá:ka people.

References

Indigenous rights organizations in Canada
Mohawk culture
First Nations in Quebec
American Indian Movement
Indigenous politics in Canada
Organizations based in Quebec
Organizations established in 1971
First Nations organizations
Political organizations based in Canada
Nationalist organizations
Land rights movements
Protest camps

Indigenous organizations in Quebec